Lalit Narayan Rajbanshi (born 27 February 1999) is a Nepalese cricketer.  He made his List A debut for Nepal against Zimbabwe in the 2018 Cricket World Cup Qualifier on 4 March 2018.

In July 2018, he was named in Nepal's squad for their One Day International (ODI) series against the Netherlands, but he did not play. These were Nepal's first ODI matches since gaining ODI status during the 2018 Cricket World Cup Qualifier.

He made his Twenty20 International (T20I) on 29 July 2018 in the 2018 MCC Tri-Nation Series, against the Netherlands.

In August 2018, he was named in Nepal's squad for the 2018 Asia Cup Qualifier tournament. In October 2018, he was named in Nepal's squad in the Eastern sub-region group for the 2018–19 ICC World Twenty20 Asia Qualifier tournament.

He made his One Day International (ODI) debut for Nepal against the United Arab Emirates on 25 January 2019.

In June 2019, he was named in Nepal's squad for the Regional Finals of the 2018–19 ICC T20 World Cup Asia Qualifier tournament. He made his first-class debut on 6 November 2019, for Nepal against the Marylebone Cricket Club (MCC), during the MCC's tour of Nepal. Later the same month, he was named in Nepal's squads for the 2019 ACC Emerging Teams Asia Cup in Bangladesh, and for the men's cricket tournament at the 2019 South Asian Games. The Nepal team won the bronze medal, after they beat the Maldives by five wickets in the third-place playoff match.

References

External links
 

1999 births
Living people
Nepalese cricketers
Nepal One Day International cricketers
Nepal Twenty20 International cricketers
Place of birth missing (living people)
Rajbongshi people
South Asian Games bronze medalists for Nepal
South Asian Games medalists in cricket